Barmah is a village in Aviz Rural District, in the Central District of Farashband County, Fars Province, Iran. At the 2006 census, its population was 33, in 5 families.

References 

Populated places in Farashband County